UMMAS (Unity Ministers of the Mid-Atlantic States) is a voluntary association of Unity Ministers, Spiritual Leaders, and their spouses/partners in North Carolina, South Carolina, Georgia, Tennessee, and Alabama.  UMMAS is a sub-region of Southeast Unity, one of the regional associations of churches affiliated with The Association of Unity Churches and Unity Worldwide Ministries.

UMMAS events
 UMMAS sponsors a 4-day Annual Retreat for laypeople and ministers from the southeast and beyond, held in early fall at Kanuga Conference Center near Hendersonville, North Carolina.
 UMMAS holds a 2-day Training & Networking session for board members and ministers from UMMAS churches, usually in mid-July.
 UMMAS holds quarterly meetings of member ministers & spouses/partners in ministry for networking, brainstorming, "heart-check" (personal support), fellowship, mentoring, networking, and planning our events.

External links
  UMMAS
  Unity Worldwide Ministries
  UMMAS Retreat
  Kanuga Conference Center 
  Southeast Unity region
  Unity Worldwide Ministries

References
  Unity regional resources

Religious organizations based in the United States